Angelis Vertzos (born 27 May 1983) is a Greek professional footballer who plays as a centre-back.

Career
He played the majority of his career in the Beta and Gamma Ethniki championships. However, in 2011, his team Doxa Drama was promoted to the Greek Superleague as a result of the Koriopolis scandal, despite finishing third in the promotion playoffs of the previous year.

On 7 January 2014, Veria announced the return of Vertzos to the club as he signed a contract for one-and-a-half years. His contract expired on 31 June 2015 and it wasn't renewed. On 22 July 2015 he signed a two-year contract with AEL. A year later, on 6 August 2016, Vertzos left the club by mutual agreement. On 9 August 2016 he joined Trikala. On 10 July 2017 he renewed his contract for another season.

References

External links
Onsports.gr profile 
 

1983 births
Living people
Association football defenders
Athlitiki Enosi Larissa F.C. players
Acharnaikos F.C. players
Paniliakos F.C. players
Proodeftiki F.C. players
Veria F.C. players
Doxa Drama F.C. players
Niki Volos F.C. players
Apollon Smyrnis F.C. players
Super League Greece players
Football League (Greece) players
Trikala F.C. players
Footballers from Athens
Greek footballers